Bhimsen Ko Antya is a Nepali play by Balkrishna Sama. It was published in 1972 by Sajha Prakashan. Sama is considered as one of the most foremost Nepalese playwright. He was awarded with the title Natya Siromani (Crest jewel of playwright). He received the prestigious Sajha Puraskar for this work.

Synopsis 
The play is divided into eight acts. The book is based on the later life of the first prime minister of modern Nepal, Bhimsen Thapa. The end days of Thapa consisted of lots of struggle. He was falsely imprisoned by various conspiracies by the other courtiers in the Durbar.

Reception 
The book was awarded with the Sajha Puraskar for 2029 BS. The award is given every year to the best book published by the publication within that year. It was the first play to win the award.

See also 

 Baikuntha Express
 Prem Pinda
 Yajnaseni

References 

1972 plays
Nepalese plays
Sajha Puraskar-winning works
20th-century Nepalese books
Cultural depictions of Bhimsen Thapa
Nepali-language books